Andrew Moray, also known as Andrew de Moray, Andrew of Moray, or Andrew Murray, was an esquire, who became one of Scotland's war-leaders during the First Scottish War of Independence. Moray, son and heir to Sir Andrew Moray of Petty, an influential north Scotland baron, initially raised a small band of supporters at Avoch Castle in early summer 1297 to fight King Edward I of England, and soon had successfully regained control of the north for the absent Scots king, John Balliol. He subsequently merged his army with that of William Wallace, and jointly led the combined army to victory at the Battle of Stirling Bridge on 11 September 1297. Moray was mortally wounded in the fighting at Stirling, dying at an unknown date and place that year.

Childhood
Andrew Moray the younger of Petty was born late in the second half of the 13th century. The date and place of his birth are unknown. Andrew's father was Sir Andrew Moray of Petty, Justiciar of Scotia (1289?–1296), and his mother was the historically-anonymous fourth daughter of John Comyn I of Badenoch.

Nothing is known of the formative years of Moray the younger's life. Similarly to other members of his social class, he likely embarked in his youth on the training for knighthood. This would have entailed him being fostered in the household of a mature knight outwith his family, where he would undergo training in horsemanship and the use of weapons, care for the knight's armour and weapons, care for the knight's horses, and serve the knight meals at the table.

The Morays of Petty’s place in Scottish society

The Morays of Petty were a wealthy and politically influential baronial family whose power base was located in the province of Moray in north-east Scotland. The family traced their origins to Freskin of Uphall, in Lothian, who was granted lands in the Laich of Moray during the 12th-century reign of King David I of Scotland. Freskin built a motte-and-bailey castle on these lands at Duffus on the north shore of Loch Spynie (this sea-loch was almost completely drained in the 18th and 19th centuries to bring hundreds of acres of land into agricultural use).

The Morays of Petty's wealth was accompanied by significant political influence. The family were loyal agents of the Scots king. Sir Andrew acted from 1289 as the king's chief law officer in north Scotland (the Justiciar) and may have been co-opted to the guardianship following in the premature death of King Alexander III.  Sir Andrew Moray of Petty had close personal connections to the most politically influential family in Scottish society, the  Comyns. Sir Andrew’s first wife, and the mother of his son, was a daughter of John (I) 'the Red' Comyn of Badenoch, and his second wife was Euphemia Comyn. The Morays of Petty also had links to the Douglases of Douglasdale.

At the outbreak of the Scottish Wars of Independence the Moray family was well established in north and south Scotland. Sir Andrew Moray of Petty the head of the north branch of the family, held the lordship of Petty, which was controlled from Hallhill manor on the south bank of the Moray Firth; the lordship of Avoch in the Black Isle, controlled from Avoch Castle situated to the east of Inverness and overlooking the Moray Firth; and the lordship of Boharm in Banffshire, controlled from Gauldwell Castle. Amongst Sir Andrew's estates at Petty were lands at Alturile, Brachlie and Croy, and at Boharm were lands at Arndilly and Botriphnie. Andrew Moray the younger was heir to these lands and castles.

The influence of the Moray family was not confined to north Scotland. Sir William Moray of Bothwell, the elder brother of Andrew the younger's father, held extensive lands in Lanarkshire and at Lilleford in Lincolnshire. 

Sir William, who was known as le riche due to his extensive personal wealth, was in 1296 constructing Bothwell Castle overlooking the River Clyde. Its design was influenced by the latest continental European trends in castle construction. It was clearly intended as an unequivocal statement of his influence and wealth. Moray the younger was also heir to his uncle's lands and castles.

The Morays of Petty also had a presence in the Scottish medieval church. A forebear of Moray the younger, also named Andrew, was bishop of Moray early in the thirteenth century and a younger brother of Sir Andrew Moray of Petty, David, was in the closing years of the thirteenth century a rector of Bothwell church in central Scotland and a canon of Moray. He would subsequently be consecrated in the summer of 1299 as Bishop of Moray by Pope Boniface VIII, and become a vociferous supporter of King Robert I's kingship.

A kingdom in turmoil 

The late thirteenth century was a time of upheaval in Scotland. On 19 March 1286, King Alexander III died after apparently being thrown from his horse as he made his way to Kinghorn, in Fife, from Edinburgh Castle to be with his young Flemish queen, Yolande. On Alexander III's death, the Crown passed to his three-year-old granddaughter, Margaret, Maid of Norway, the children of his previous marriage to  Margaret, a sister of King Edward I, having predeceased him. The child-queen was never enthroned, dying in 1290 during the sea passage to Scotland.

Scots nobles vied for the vacant crown. The Bruces of Annandale had already made an unsuccessful attempt in November 1286 to seize it in an armed coup. In this uncertain time, Scotland's leaders sought support from King Edward I of England. The price of Edward I's involvement in what became known as 'The Great Cause' was the claimants' acknowledgement of him as overlord of Scotland. Edward duly presided over a court to assess the merits of these claims. The most serious claims were advanced by John Balliol, the lord of Galloway, and Robert Bruce, lord of Annandale and grandfather of the future king. Balliol was eventually awarded the Crown, and duly swore fealty to Scotland's new English overlord, Edward I. This decision was widely accepted by the Scottish political community, including many who had previously supported Bruce.

Invasion and defeat

King Edward I became a constant presence in Scottish legal and political affairs. The Scottish political community did not welcome his involvement, and by late 1295 King John had renounced his fealty to the English king and entered into a treaty with France. King Edward was reputedly enraged by such defiance, making hostilities between the kingdoms inevitable.

Andrew Moray the younger was part of the Scottish feudal host assembling at Caddonlee in March 1296 in preparation for war with England. He was likely part of his father's retinue. A part of Scottish host, led by the earls of Atholl, Ross, and Mar and John Comyn the younger of Badenoch, entered Cumberland. It marched to Carlisle, destroying, according to The St. Edmundsbury Chronicle, 120 villages. More Scots raiders crossed from Jedburgh, burning homes and farms in Northumberland. Pierre de Langtoft, an English chronicler, records:

King Edward I assembled a large army on the Anglo-Scottish border for the invasion of Scotland. By 30 March it was besieging the prosperous Scottish port of Berwick.

Berwick soon fell and was sacked by the English army. The English Lanercost Chronicle condemned this slaughter as a "crime" and recorded that fifteen thousand "of both sexes perished, some by the sword, others by fire, in the space of a day and a half". 

It had been many years since Scotland had mobilized for war, and at the Battle of Dunbar the Scots were overwhelmed quickly by a detachment from led by John de Warenne, Earl of Surrey. The author of the Chronicle of Bury St. Edmunds records the death of eight thousand Scots soldiers at Dunbar.

Scotland now capitulated. Edward I deposed King John at Montrose castle: the symbols of the Scottish kingship were stripped from him, including the royal coat of arms from his surcoat (thereby earning him the enduring title Toom Tabard, 'Empty Coat'). King Edward undertook an extended march across Scotland, reaching Elgin on 26 July 1296. He remained in the town's castle for a few days, taking the fealty of a number of Scots nobles.

Scots nobles captured at Dunbar were sent to prisons across England. The most important prisoners, such as Sir Andrew Moray of Petty, were taken to the Tower of London. Sir Andrew spent the remainder of his life there, dying in the Tower on 8 April 1298. Andrew Moray the younger, a prisoner of little significance, was imprisoned in Chester Castle.

Rebellion
King Edward's English administration in the defeated Scottish kingdom was headed by the Earl of Surrey. Sir Hugh de Cressingham was appointed Treasurer, and Walter Amersham, Chancellor. The Justiciars for Lothian, Scotia (i.e. the territories north of the Forth), and Galloway were English appointees. Most of Scotland's former royal castles were held by English nobles. 

Cressingham had by the end of May 1297 dispatched £5,188 6s. 8d. to the English treasury. Edward also sought to conscript Scots, including the nobility, into the armies being raised to fight in Flanders. This plan caused widespread alarm across Scotland and further contributed to growing restlessness against English rule.

While the Scots suffered under English occupation, Andrew Moray the younger continued to be imprisoned in Chester castle, but sometime in winter 1296–97 he escaped and made his way back to his father's lands in north Scotland.

Scotland may have been easily conquered by King Edward in 1296, but outbreaks of violence soon followed against the English occupiers and their Scots allies. These are usually dated to May 1297.  Argyll and Ross were the scenes of earlier violence. In Argyll, Lachlann Mac Ruaidhrí and Ruaidhrí Mac Ruaidhrí were in rebellion, attacking Edward I's MacDonald supporters, killing royal officials and destroying royal property. In Galloway the rebels seized English-held castles. There was also violence Aberdeenshire and in Fife, where MacDuff of Fife and his sons led the rising. In Central Scotland, William Hesilrig, the English sheriff of Lanark, was murdered on 3 May 1297, during an attack on the town led by William Wallace and Richard Lundie. 

Andrew Moray the younger was also involved in the uprising against English rule. He raised his standard at Avoch in the first days of May 1297. News of Moray's actions  drew supporters to him. Sir William fitz Warin, the English constable of Urquhart Castle on the shores of Loch Ness, wrote to King Edward in July 1297:  Amongst them were Alexander Pilche, a burgess from Inverness, and a number of burgesses from the town.

King Edward I ordered supporters in Argyll and Ross to assist the Sheriff of Argyll Alexander of the Isles to suppress the rebels. The English Sheriff of Aberdeen, Sir Henry de Latham, was ordered on 11 June 1297 to deal with rebels Aberdeenshire. Men were dispatched from England, including Henry Percy and Walter Clifford, to suppress the rebellion.

Attack on Castle Urquhart
In May 1297 Andrew Moray the younger was leading the rebellion in the province of Moray. King Edward's Scots lieutenant in the area was Sir Reginald Cheyne, the sheriff of Elgin. Cheyne was alarmed by the growth of Moray's rebellion, writing to the king to request assistance. In response to the king's orders to suppress the rebellion, Sir Reginald ordered his subordinates to a meeting at Inverness Castle on 25 May 1297 to discuss how to deal with Moray. One participant was Sir William fitz Warin constable of Urquhart Castle standing on the western shore of Loch Ness.

After this meeting, Sir William fitz Warin returned to his castle accompanied by an escort of men-at-arms. A few miles south of Inverness, he was unsuccessfully ambushed by a force led by Moray and Alexander Pilche. Next day, Sir William found himself besieged in his castle by Moray. The Countess of Ross unexpectedly arrived on the scene with her retinue. The countess, whose husband was held by King Edward in the Tower of London, advised him to surrender. Moray, with no siege ebigness, unsuccessfully tried to take the castle in a night attack. He left Sir William to send an account of this mêlee to his king.

King Edward fights back 
Although Andrew Moray the younger was thwarted at Urquhart Castle, he continued to prosecute a vigorous campaign against his enemies in the province of Moray. The devastation of Sir Reginald Cheyne's lands was later reported to King Edward

King Edward I of England, who was preparing to campaign in Flanders, sought to deal with the threat posed by Andrew Moray by making use of Scots nobles released from his prisons. The king issued orders on 11 June 1297 to a number of apparently loyal Scots lords to raise their retinues and march into the province of Moray to relieve fitz Warin and to restore English authority. They included Henry Cheyne, Bishop of Aberdeen, Sir Gartnait of Mar, heir to the earldom of Mar and whose father was currently held in the Tower of London, and John Comyn, Earl of Buchan and Constable of Scotland, together with his brother, Alexander. The Comyn brothers, who were related to Moray via his mother, were to remain in the province of Moray until the rebellion had been stamped out.

The column departed from Aberdeen in early July 1297, and Moray the younger  responded by marching east to confront it. The two forces met on the banks of the River Spey at Enzie, where the road from Aberdeen to Inverness forded the waters of the river, on the eastern edge of the province of Moray. 

An extremely ambiguous account of events at Enzie was sent on 25 August 1297 from Inverness to King Edward by Bishop Cheyn, It relates that after some discussion, Moray and his rebel army withdrew into  This was a highly dubious explanation when one considers the Comyn family pacified for the Scots king the province of Moray in the early thirteenth century. It appears more likely that neither side wished to fight men that they did not consider their enemies. But if Cheyne thought he could save face with this letter, he failed to reckon with Hugh de Cressingham. Cressingham, having seen this letter, wrote to the king on 5 August: 

Cressingham clearly did not believe that the Scots lords tasked with dealing with Moray had done their duty, believing they were playing a double game at King Edward's expense. He was especially dismissive of the account of confrontation at the Spey, writing to King Edward:

While Andrew Moray seized control of north Scotland and William Wallace was active in west-central Scotland, a rising led by Scotland's traditional feudal leaders was taking place in the south of the kingdom. Amongst its leaders were James, the High Steward of Scotland, Robert Wishart, Bishop of Glasgow, and Robert Bruce of Carrick, the future king. Faced with an army led by Henry de Percy and Robert de Clifford, they entered negotiations in June and capitulated at Irvine in July. 

In summer 1297 King Edward proposed to release the younger Moray's father, Sir Andrew Moray of Petty, from imprisonment in the Tower to serve in the ranks of the English army in Flanders, if his son was prepared to take his father's place as a royal hostage. A safe conduct, allowing him to come to England, was issued under the king's seal on 28 August 1297. It is not known if this letter ever reached him, but if it did, it was ignored and his father remained confined in the Tower, dying there on 4 April 1298.

Battle of Stirling Bridge 

By late summer 1297, King Edward I had lost control of Scotland. The extent of the breakdown in his rule was described in a letter to him from Cressingham:

Of the castles north of the River Forth, only Dundee remained in English hands. 

In the late summer of 1297, the earl of Surrey finally acted against Moray and Wallace.  He was subsequently vilified for this indolence. Walter of Guisborough, said of him: 
Moray and Wallace, who were besieging Dundee castle, entrusted the siege to the townspeople and marched to Stirling to meet him. They deployed their men to the north of the River Forth, close to the old bridge at Stirling and Stirling Castle. 

Surrey was outmanoeuvred and outfought in the ensuing battle. The key to it was the bridge over the river Forth.  Walter of Guisborough said that it was  Surrey deployed the vanguard of his army across it. Moray and Wallace struck when only part of the English vanguard had crossed. In the Battle of Stirling Bridge, this vanguard was destroyed. The bulk of Surrey's army, which had still not crossed the bridge, fled. Surrey led this flight. He galloped for Berwick, causing one English chronicler, Walter of Guisborough, to sneer that Surrey's "charger never once tasted food during the whole journey".

The  casualties of the Scottish army, composed largely of anonymous infantry soldiers, were unrecorded. But there was one recorded casualty: Andrew Moray the younger.

Walter of Guisborough stated that Surrey lost one hundred knights and five thousand infantrymen at Stirling. This is likely an over estimate. The most notable death was Hugh Cressingham. According to the chronicle of Pierre de Langtoft Cressingham, unaccustomed  The Lanercost Chronicle claims that Wallace had: 

The defeat of Surrey at the Battle of Stirling Bridge was the zenith of Moray the younger's military career. He was no skilled soldier by accident. The training for knighthood that he had received as a baron's son equipped him with the skills to fulfill a leadership role in Scotland's feudal host.

Death 
There is seemingly contradictory evidence about the death of Andrew Moray the younger. Two letters issued in autumn 1297 appear to indicate he survived for some months after the fighting at Stirling Bridge. The first letter was sent from Haddington on 11 October 1297 to the mayors of Lübeck and Hamburg, two of the leading towns of the Hanseatic League. It was issued by: The second was sent just under a month later, on 7 November, during a Scottish raid on the northern counties of England. It was issued to the prior of Hexham by: Moray's name does not appear on any later document.

The inclusion of Moray the younger's name in these letters is apparently contradicted by a formal inquisition into the affairs of his recently-deceased uncle, Sir William Moray of Bothwell. It was held in Berwick-upon-Tweed in November 1300 and determined that Moray the younger was: "slain at Stirling against the king." No chronicle source places Moray at Hexham or ascribes to him any role in this raid, which Walter Guisborough's chronicle says was led by Wallace. The letters issued to the mayors of Lübeck and Hamburg, and to the prior of Hexham, may, for reasons now unknown and unclear to us, have been issued in Moray's absence.

In response to these apparently conflicting facts, most historians choose to believe that Moray the younger was wounded at Stirling Bridge, later dying of his injuries sometime around November 1297.

Legacy 
Andrew Moray the younger's early death has meant that his achievements have not fully received the recognition that they deserve. There are no statues or monuments to him. Moray's deeds are often obscured by the greater fame of William Wallace. Wallace has received more attention, much of which is attributable to the 11,000 line biographical poem, The Acts and Deeds of the Illustrious and Valiant Champion Sir William Wallace, written in the late fifteenth-century reputedly by Scots poet Blind Hary. Nevertheless, in the late twentieth century there was increased recognition of Moray's important role in the events of 1297. One historian recently described his actions as "the greatest threat to the English government".

One legacy that is not in doubt is the birth of his son. At Pentecost 1298, Andrew Moray the younger's widow bore him a son,  also named Andrew. The child eventually acceded to the lordships of Avoch, Boharm, Petty and Bothwell, and would play a major role in leading the resistance to the attempts of King Edward III of England, grandson of Edward I, to conquer Scotland in the 1330s. He would twice be appointed Guardian of the Realm during the minority of King David II, the son of Robert I.

Andrew Moray the younger's lack of recognition has been the subject of discussion in the Scotland's parliament. In December 2009, Murdo Fraser, a Conservative List MSP for Mid-Scotland and Fife, called for a national debate on an appropriate monument to Moray. He stated that it should raise awareness of Moray's historical role.

See also
Bothwell Castle
Clan Murray
Duffus Castle
History of Scotland
Kildrummy Castle
Robert Wishart

Notes

References
 Anglo-Scottish Relations 1174-1328: Some Selected Documents, ed. E. L. G Stones, 1970;
 Barron, E. M., The Scottish War of Independence, Second Edition. 1934;
 Barrow, G. W. S. Robert Bruce and the Community of the Realm, Third Edition, 1988;
 Barrow, G. W. S. Robert Bruce and the Community of the Realm, Fourth Edition, 2005;
 Barrow, G. W. S. The Kingdom of the Scots, Second Edition, 2003;
 Broun, D, New information on the Guadians' appointment in 1286 and Wallace's rising in 1297, September 2011, www.thebreakingofbritain.ac.uk
 Brown, M., The Wars of Scotland 1214–1371, 2004;
 Calendar of Documents Relating to Scotland, Four Volumes, ed. J. Bain, 1881–1888;
 The Chronicle of Walter of Guisborough, ed. H. Rothwell, 1957;
 Chronicle of Holyrood, ed. M. A. Anderson, 1938;
 The Chronicle of Lanercost 1272–1346, ed. H. Maxwell, 1913;
 The Chronicle of Pierre de Langtoft, ed. T Wright, Two volumes. 1866–8.
 Documents Illustrative of Scotland 1286-1306," ed. Rev. J. Stevenson, 2 vols. 1870;
 Ferguson, J, William Wallace, 1938;
 Fisher, A, William Wallace, 1992;
 Foedera, Conventiones, Litterae, ed T. Rymer, 1816;
 Kightly, Folk Heroes of Britain, 1982;
 Oram, Richard, Ed., The Kings and Queens of Scotland, Stroud, 2001;
 Oram, Richard, David I: The King who made Scotland, Stroud, 2004;
 
 Prestwich, M., Edward I, 1990;
 The Scalacronica of Sir Thomas Gray, ed. Sir H. Maxwell, 1907;
 A Source Book of Scottish History. Three Volumes. Second Edition, eds. W. C. Dickson, G. Donaldson and I. A. Milne, 1958;
 Taylor, J. G., Fighting for the Lion: The Life of Andrew Moray, in History Scotland, September/October 2005;
 Watson F. J., Under the Hammer: Edward I and Scotland 1286-1306, 1998.

1297 deaths
Scottish generals
Scottish Roman Catholics
Scottish people of the Wars of Scottish Independence
Scottish rebels
People from Ross and Cromarty
Scottish escapees
Scottish pre-union military personnel killed in action
Guardians of Scotland
Year of birth unknown
Andrew